The Norway national football team represents Norway in international association football. It is fielded by The Football Association of Norway, NFF, the governing body of football in Norway, and competes as a member of the Union of European Football Associations (UEFA), which encompasses the countries of Europe. Norway competed for the first time on 12 July 1908, in a match the team lost 3–11 against Sweden.

Norway have competed in numerous competitions, and all players who have played between ten and twenty-four matches, either as a member of the starting eleven or as a substitute, are listed below. Each player's details include his usual playing position while with the team, the number of caps earned and goals scored in all international matches, and details of the first and most recent matches played in. The names are initially ordered by number of caps (in descending order), then by date of debut, then by alphabetical order. All statistics are correct up to 18 November 2019.

Key

Players

See also
List of Norway international footballers, covering players with twenty-five or more caps
List of Norway international footballers (2–9 caps)
List of Norway international footballers with one cap

References

 
Association football player non-biographical articles